The Nichlavka is a river in Ukraine, within the Chortkiv District of the Ternopil Oblast. Right tributary of the Nichlava (Dniester basin).

Description and location
Length 42 km. The valley is V-shaped. The floodplain is bilateral. The river is moderately winding.

It originates northwest of the village of Sukhostav. It flows first to the southeast, then to the south, in the estuary - again to the southeast. It flows into the Nichlava north of the village of Davydkivtsi.

Tributaries
Right: Frog Stream, Oryshka.
Left: Arrow (Rudka Mala).

Settlements
Above the river are the following villages, settlements (from the sources to the mouth): Sukhostav, Yabluniv, Kopychyntsi, Kotivka, Teklivka, Gadynkivtsi, Shvaikivtsi, Shmankivtsi, Kolyndyany.

References

Sources
 Гуменюк, Л. Чому річка — «НІЧЛАВА»?… / Людмила Гуменюк // Голос народу. — 2017. — № 16 (21 квіт.). — С. 5. — (Наше).
 Річки України, басейн Дністра
 Управління екології та природних ресурсів Тернопільської ОДА
 Публічна кадастрова карта України

Rivers of Ternopil Oblast